Ammoperdix is a small genus in the pheasant family Phasianidae of the order Galliformes.  It contains two similar species:

 See-see partridge, Ammoperdix griseogularis
 Sand partridge, Ammoperdix heyi

The see-see partridge occurs in southwest Asia, and the sand partridge in Egypt and the Middle East. Both are resident breeders in dry, open country, often in hill areas.

They are mainly sandy brown, with wavy white and brown stripes on their flanks. The males have distinctively-patterned grey heads, but the females are very washed-out in comparison, and this lack of a distinctive head pattern makes it more difficult to distinguish their species.

When disturbed, Ammoperdix partridges prefer to run rather than take to the air, but if necessary they will fly a short distance on rounded wings.

References
 Pheasants, Partridges and Grouse by Madge and McGowan, 

 
Bird genera
 
Taxa named by John Gould